Living in the Gleam of an Unsheathed Sword is a live album by the American drone band Earth.

Track listing

Credits
Dylan Carlson – guitar
Adrienne Davies – drums

Earth (American band) live albums
2005 live albums